Caution is the second studio album by the Canadian digital hardcore band Left Spine Down. It was released on August 23, 2011 through Metropolis Records.

Track listing
 "Troubleshoot"
 "Truth is a Lie"
 "X-Ray"
 "Hit and Run"
 "On the Other Side"
 "Stolen Car"
 "From Thirty to Zero"
 "Overdriven"
 "Nothing to Fear"
 "Caution"

References

2011 albums
Left Spine Down albums
Metropolis Records albums